Juan Garcia Estrada (1895–1961) was an Argentine symphonic composer of a series of symphonic dances, among them the Ruralia Argentina. He studied first with José Gil in Buenos Aires and then with Jacques Ibert in Paris.

After returning to Argentina, he virtually abandoned music, becoming a Justice of the Peace.

References 

Argentine composers
1895 births
1961 deaths
20th-century composers